Donald Blair (born April 6, 1972, in Ottawa, Ontario) is a former Canadian football wide receiver who played eight seasons in the Canadian Football League from 1996 to 2003 for the Edmonton Eskimos, BC Lions, and Calgary Stampeders. In his professional career, Blair had 310 catches for 4642 yards and 26 touchdowns. He was a member of the 2000 BC Lions team that won the 88th Grey Cup. He played CIS football for the Calgary Dinos where he won the Hec Crighton Trophy in 1995.

References

External links
Career Bio

1972 births
Living people
Canadian football wide receivers
Edmonton Elks players
Calgary Dinos football players
BC Lions players
Calgary Stampeders players
Canadian football people from Ottawa
Players of Canadian football from Ontario